Judie Byrd is an American chef and host of the cooking series Judie Byrd's Kitchen.

References

American women chefs
Living people
Year of birth missing (living people)
Place of birth missing (living people)
21st-century American women